Taphroceroides is a genus of beetles in the family Buprestidae, the jewel beetles. The genus was erected in 2008 for T. mimeticus, a new species from Costa Rica. Two other species have since been described from French Guiana.

Species:
Taphroceroides curlettii Brûlé, 2012
Taphroceroides guyanensis Brûlé, 2012
Taphroceroides mimeticus Hespenheide, 2008

References

External links
Taphroceroides Specimens.  Muséum Naturale d’Histoire Naturelle, Paris.

Buprestidae genera